Another Man's Wife is a 1934 novel by the British writer Marie Belloc Lowndes.

References

Bibliography
 Vinson, James. Twentieth-Century Romance and Gothic Writers. Macmillan, 1982. Google Books 

1934 British novels
Novels by Marie Belloc Lowndes
Heinemann (publisher) books
Longman books